Taygetomorpha is a genus of satyrid butterflies found in the Neotropical realm.

Species
Listed alphabetically:
Taygetomorpha celia (Cramer, [1779])
Taygetomorpha puritana (Weeks, 1902)

References

Euptychiina
Nymphalidae of South America
Butterfly genera